Eltz (Luxembourgish: Elz) is a village in northwestern Luxembourg.

It is situated in the commune of Redange and has a population of 45.

References 

Villages in Luxembourg